Marcus Antonio Green (born August 13, 1996) is an American football wide receiver for the New Jersey Generals of the United States Football League (USFL). He played college football at Louisiana–Monroe and was drafted by the Atlanta Falcons in the sixth round of the 2019 NFL Draft.

College career
Green was redshirted his freshman year, and then led Louisiana-Monroe in receptions and yards his redshirt freshman year with 63 receptions for 698 yards. Green had his breakthrough year as a junior, leading the NCAA with a 32.4 yard average on kick returns, and also leading the NCAA with 4 kickoff returns for touchdowns.  Green finished his Warhawk career tied for the all time school lead in receiving touchdowns with 23, #3 in career receptions with 202, and #2 in career receiving yards with 2698.

Professional career

Atlanta Falcons
Green was drafted by the Atlanta Falcons in the sixth round (203rd overall) of the 2019 NFL Draft. He was waived during final roster cuts on August 31, 2019.

Philadelphia Eagles
Green was signed to the Philadelphia Eagles' practice squad on September 1, 2019. He signed a reserve/future contract with the Eagles on January 6, 2020.

Green was waived on July 26, 2020, and re-signed on August 17, 2020. He was waived again by the Eagles on September 3, 2020. He was re-signed to the practice squad on September 24. He was released on November 3.

Hamilton Tiger-Cats
Green signed with the Hamilton Tiger-Cats of the CFL on April 16, 2021. He re-signed with the team on March 30, 2022, but retired on May 19, 2022.

New Jersey Generals
Green signed with the New Jersey Generals of the USFL on October 22, 2022.

Personal life
Green's mother, RheaKesha Vaughn, is a professional urban contemporary gospel recording artist. She also holds the position of Minister of Music of District 10 - Tupelo District of the Church of God in Christ Northern Mississippi Ecclesiastical Jurisdiction.

References

External links
Louisiana-Monroe Warhawks bio
Atlanta Falcons bio

1996 births
Living people
American football wide receivers
Atlanta Falcons players
Hamilton Tiger-Cats players
Louisiana–Monroe Warhawks football players
New Jersey Generals (2022) players
People from Pontotoc, Mississippi
Philadelphia Eagles players
Players of American football from Mississippi